Necker Island, in Hawaiian Mokumanamana ("Branched Island"), is a small island in the Northwestern Hawaiian Islands. It is part of the State of Hawaii in the United States. It contains important prehistoric archaeological sites of the Hawaiian culture and is part of the Hawaiian Islands National Wildlife Refuge within the Papahānaumokuākea Marine National Monument.

The island is rocky with steep sides and has very little soil. The island is named after Jacques Necker, a finance minister of Louis XVI.

Administration

Politically, Necker Island is part of the City and County of Honolulu in the State of Hawaii. However, as part of the Hawaiian Islands National Wildlife Refuge, it is administered by the United States Fish and Wildlife Service. It has no resident human population.

Geography

Composed of basalt, the island is steep-sided and barren, with very little soil, and its rocks are heavily scoured and eroded.

The westernmost point on Necker Island is Mo'o Point (or Mo'o Head). Northwest Cape is connected to the rest of the island by a narrow gap that is barely above sea level. Northwest Cape's tip is the northernmost point of the island.

The main ridge of the island and Northwest Cape combine to partially enclose Shark Bay along the northern shore of the island; the bay opens to the northeast and usually is subject to rough seas. Along the island's western shore, West Cove lies between Mo'o Point and the southern end of Northwest Cape.

The main ridge of Necker Island has five peaks. East to west, they are:

Summit Hill (or Vaughn Peak), 84 meters (277 ft) high, the island's highest point
Annexation Peak (also Annexation Hill or Captain Brown Peak), 75 meters (247 ft) high

Bowl Cave is located on the northern slope of Bowl Hill. It is an important archaeological site.

Necker Island has an average annual rainfall of just under .

Flora and fauna

Five species of plants are known to occur:
Goosefoot shrub (Chenopodium sandwicheum), found on the island's terraced slopes
Bunch grass (Panicum torridum) (i.e., kakonakona), which grows on the north slope of the ridge
Purslane (Portulaca lutea) (i.e., ihi weed), found on flat tops of the ridge
Pickle weed (Sesuvium portulacastrum), a patch of which grows on the lower northeastern slope of Annexation Hill, where ocean spray from waves breaking in Shark Bay can reach it
Ohai shrub (Sesbania tomentasa), which grows on the crest of the ridge

The forester of the Territory of Hawaii attempted to introduce six other species of plants to Necker Island in June 1923, but all had died out by the latter half of the 1930s, if not earlier.

The island is also noted for large numbers of birds. About 16 species of seabird nest on Necker Island; during nesting season, an estimated 60,000 birds nest on the island, and their eggs cover virtually every piece of level ground. A seabird first observed at Necker Island and at the French Frigate Shoals and Nihoa in 1902 originally was thought to be new to science and was given the scientific name Procelsterna saxatalis and the popular name "Necker Island tern," but it later was identified as a subspecies of the blue-grey noddy, already known from farther south in the Pacific. No land birds live on the island. Land animals found on the island include land snails and 15 species of insect found nowhere else, as well as wolf spiders and bird ticks.

Although it is the second-smallest of the Northwestern Hawaiian Islands, Necker Island has the second-largest surrounding marine habitat among the islands, totaling , with Shark Bay, West Cove, Northwest Cape, and miles of shallow reef to the southeast of the island providing large offshore habitats. Runoff from the heavily eroded rock surfaces of the island and the constant wave action that scours its underwater basalt structure interfere with the growth of corals; little coral life exists in the shallow areas surrounding the island, and it lacks a fringing reef. However, 16 species of stony coral live in the area, and Necker is the easternmost island in the Hawaiian archipelago where table corals of the genus Acropora are found. Gray reef sharks and manta rays are common off the island, and Hawaiian monk seals populate its shores, some giving birth to pups there. Green sea turtles bask on the shore in the narrow gap between the main island and Northwest Cape, but they do not breed on Necker Island because the island lacks sandy beaches in which they could lay their eggs. A great abundance and diversity of sea cucumbers, sea urchins, and lobsters live in Shark Bay. Extensive deeper "shelves" extend many miles from the island's shallow reef, especially to the southeast, and commercial fishing takes place over these shelves, which produce much of Hawaii's catch of green jobfish, known locally as gray snapper or uku. Deep sea fish types that live hundreds of meters (yards) below the surface along the underwater slopes of Necker Island include fishes of the orders Stomiiformes, Gadiformes, Myctophiformes, and Aulopiformes.

Archaeology

Necker Island is known for its numerous religious sites and cultural objects. There are few, if any, signs of long-term habitation, giving rise to the theory that people visited the island for short periods from other islands instead of settling permanently. Many anthropologists believe that the island was a ceremonial and religious site. Necker has 55 currently known sites including 33 ritual sites called heiau, while the remaining sites represent agricultural terraces, miscellaneous platforms, and shelter caves — of which Bowl Cave is the largest. Cultural sites on Necker Island are contemporaneous with those on Nihoa and appear to have been abandoned at roughly the same time several centuries prior to European contact with the Hawaiian Islands.

The heiau on Necker Island and Nihoa are unique in the Hawaiian chain representing a raised pavement of basalt stones with upright stones placed across this pavement often near the edges as opposed to the form common to other islands in the chain represented by a high stacked stone wall enclosing a central space. This difference in form represents an earlier iteration of Hawaiian monumental architecture that offers a unique perspective on cultural norms prior to the abandonment of Necker. Thanks to this difference in form, scholars often use the term 'marae' as opposed to 'heiau' in reference to these structures and some scholars argue that the shift in form represents a shift in ritual practice in Hawaii.

Artifacts excavated on Necker Island show a remarkable number of artifacts that would normally be made out of wood rendered in stone. This is especially true of the presence of a series of remarkable carved stone bowls and a bird snare that would have required far more time and effort to create from stone. Additionally, a series of human figures carved from local stone have been recovered from Necker. These statues are up to 1.5 feet (0.5 m) in length and differ in style and medium to similar sculptures (usually rendered in wood) recovered elsewhere in Hawaii. Other artifacts include adzes, fish and squid lures, hammer stones, awls, and other stone tools commonly found across the Hawaiian Islands.

According to the oral traditions of the people of Kauai, which lies to the southeast, Necker Island was the last known refuge for a race of mythical "little people" called the Menehune. According to the legend, the Menehune settled on Necker Island after being chased off Kauai by the stronger Polynesians and subsequently built the various stone structures there.

History
Geological research in the early 21st century indicates that Necker Island is about 10 million years old. While it rises only about 84 meters (277 ft) above sea level now, it reached  in height earlier in its history and at one time was comparable in size to modern Oahu.

Hawaiians appear to have started visiting Necker Island a few hundred years after they settled the main Hawaiian Islands. Archaeologists believe that the island's poor soil for farming and its small size and relative lack of rainfall made it uninhabitable, and that the Hawaiians visited from Nihoa and other nearby islands to worship at religious sites without establishing any permanent settlements. Their visits appear to have ended a few hundred years before European contact, and by the time Europeans first visited Hawaii in the late eighteenth century, Necker Island apparently was unknown to the Hawaiians.

The French explorer Jean-François de La Pérouse was on a mission of exploration for the French Academy of Sciences aboard the ships L'Astrolabe (under command of Fleuriot de Langle) and La Boussole that made many discoveries across the Pacific — and had just discovered the French Frigate Shoals (Basse des Frégates Françaises) and his namesake rock La Perouse Pinnacle — when on November 4, 1786, he became the first European to visit Necker Island. La Pérouse did not attempt to land on the island due to its nearly vertical sides and the violent seas breaking on its shore, but he sailed within a third of a league of it and named it after Jacques Necker, a Genevan banker and statesman who served as finance minister for Louis XVI of France. Although the expedition was lost at sea in 1788, it was able to send its logs home before its loss, bringing the island's existence to the attention of Europeans. The first people to set foot on Necker Island in modern times appear to have been the British seaman John Turnbull of the ship Margaret, who visited the Hawaiian Islands between December 17, 1802, and January 21, 1803, and two Hawaiian pearl divers in his employ; the three men landed on the island during an expedition to find pearls on a reef in the Northwestern Hawaiian Islands.

Captain John or William Paty (sources disagree on Paty's first name) claimed Necker Island for the Kingdom of Hawaii in 1857, although he did not land on the island. The claim was disputed over the following decades. In January 1859, United States Navy Lieutenant J. M. Brook aboard the survey schooner  visited Necker Island and determined its position. During the summer of 1859, Captain N. C. Brook of the Hawaiian barque Gambia passed the island during a sealing and exploration voyage, but did not report landing on it.

As late as the early 1890s, the Kingdom of Hawaii's claim to Necker Island remained in dispute, and the United Kingdom was considering the island as a potential waypoint location for a submarine communications cable between Canada and Australia as part of the British Empire telegraph network known informally as the All Red Line. The Kingdom of Hawaii was overthrown in 1893 and replaced by the Provisional Government of Hawaii, and when the British corvette  arrived at Honolulu in 1894, the provisional government's president, Sanford B. Dole, became concerned that the United Kingdom was about to establish a claim to Necker Island. Wishing to curry favor with the United States rather than the United Kingdom, Dole immediately dispatched an expedition under Captain James A. King to Necker to annex the island. On May 27, 1894, a landing party of 12 men led by King went ashore on Necker for four hours, raised the flag of Hawaii on what became known as Annexation Hill, and read an annexation proclamation. The move brought international disputes over claims to the island to an end and the island was included in the Republic of Hawaii when it was founded on July 4, 1894, although the British government continued to attempt to negotiate with the Hawaiian government over use of Necker Island and on September 24, 1894, Champion landed a party on the island. On July 12, 1895, King led a Hawaiian government expedition — which also included the first director of the Bishop Museum, William Tufts Brigham, and Professor William DeWitt Alexander — to Necker to survey and map the island and conduct archaeological research. On August 12, 1898, the United States annexed the Hawaiian Islands, including Necker Island, and Necker was included in the Territory of Hawaii upon its creation on April 30, 1900.

In 1902, the United States Fish Commission research ship USFC Albatross visited Necker Island, and her personnel thought they discovered the "Necker Island tern" there, as well as on Nihoa and at the French Frigate Shoals, during their visit, although the bird later was determined to be a subspecies of the blue-grey noddy, already known from farther south in the Pacific. The island was leased for commercial fishing purposes for 21 years on June 2, 1904, and on February 3, 1909, it became part of the Hawaiian Islands Bird Reservation, managed jointly by the United States Department of Agriculture and the Territory of Hawaii.

George N. Wilcox visited Necker Island twice on unrecorded dates, and the United States Revenue Cutter Service revenue cutter USRC Thetis visited the island in 1910 and 1913, as did an expedition led by H. L. Tucker in 1917. The warden of the Hawaiian Islands Bird Reservation landed on the island on October 6, 1919, and found stone artifacts during his visit. The Tanager Expedition visited Necker Island in 1923 and 1924, and is noted for exploring the island's biology and archaeology; during its first visit, from June 12 to 29, 1923, it mapped the island and studied its flora and fauna in detail, and on its return visit from July 14 to July 17, 1924, it conducted a thorough archaeological survey.

On August 21, 1959, the state of Hawaii was created, and Necker was included in the new state. Because of Necker Island's usage by Native Hawaiians as a ceremonial and religious site in Ancient Hawaii, the United States government added the island to its National Register of Historic Places in 1988. In 1997, members of the Native Hawaiian organization Hui Mälama I Nä Kupuna O Hawaiʻi Nei ("Hawaiʻi Ancestral Care Association") visited the island to rebury human bones found there which had been transported to Honolulu and kept at Bishop Museum.

In the early 21st century, Necker Island was a place of study for benthic invertebrates and algal assemblages. On June 15, 2006, the United States established the Papahānaumokuākea Marine National Monument, with Necker Island within its boundaries.

Access

Access to Necker Island is by boat, and is quite difficult because of the island's nearly vertical coastline. Heavy surf usually precludes landings along the coast in Shark Bay, but a small lee exists west of Northwest Cape, and landing on rocky shelves there is possible in moderately calm weather but can be dangerous in high surf.

Visits to Necker Island are permitted only for scientific, educational, and cultural purposes and require the approval of the United States Fish and Wildlife Service, which gives preference to scientific and cultural visits.

Gallery

See also

 List of volcanoes in the Hawaiian – Emperor seamount chain
 List of islands
 Desert island
 Necker Island (British Virgin Islands) (dab)
 Stonehenge (famous site with standing stones)

References

Footnotes

Bibliography

Bryan, Edwin H.,Jr. The Northwestern Hawaiian Islands: An Annotated Bibliography. Honolulu: United States Fish and Wildlife Service, April 1978.
Étienne Taillemite, “GALAUP, JEAN-FRANÇOIS DE, Comte de LAPÉROUSE,” in Dictionary of Canadian Biography, vol. 4, University of Toronto/Université Laval, 2003–, accessed October 14, 2021.
Gilmore, Roland. "Mystery Islands." Hana Hou! The Magazine of Hawaiian Airlines. August–September 2010.
Harrison, Craig S., Seabirds of Hawaii: Natural History and Conservation, Ithaca, New York: Cornell University Press, 1990 
Rauzon, Mark J. Isles of Refuge: Wlldlife and History of the Northwestern Hawaiian Islands. Honolulu: University of Hawaii Press.

Further reading

External links

Northwest Hawaiian Islands Multi-Agency Education Project "Necker Island"
Janeresture.com: Necker Island
PBS Ocean Adventures website: Quick Facts on Necker Island
NOAA Essay
Papahānaumokuākea Marine National Monument Information Management System
Pictures of Necker Island (National Oceanic Atmospheric Administration)
Mokumanamana To Be Visited During Makali'i Voyage (June 14, 2019) on YouTube
Voyaging Canoes Expect to Reach Mokumanamana this Evening (video)

Northwestern Hawaiian Islands
Hawaiian–Emperor seamount chain
Volcanoes of Hawaii
Archaeological sites on the National Register of Historic Places in Hawaii
Miocene volcanoes
Paleogene Oceania
Cenozoic Hawaii
National Register of Historic Places in Honolulu County, Hawaii
Important Bird Areas of Hawaii